Nicole Rolser (born 7 February 1992) is a German footballer who last played for Bayern Munich.

Career
Rolser started her professional career in 2009–10 at second division VfL Sindelfingen. In their first season she played 21 league matches and scored one goal. For 2010–11, Rolser moved to Bundesliga SC 07 Bad Neuenahr, where she became a regular player straight away and scored ten goals in 21 league games. Her debut was on 15 August 2010 in a 4–3 victory at home to SG Essen-Schönebeck, scoring a goal to put her side 3–2 up in the 63rd Minute.

In December 2012, Rolser signed a contract with the Liverpool Ladies in the English WSL. With the FA WSL side she won two league titles consecutively in 2013 and 2014.

On 2 July 2015 Rolser signed with the German club Bayern Munich on a two-year contract.

Honours

Club
Liverpool Ladies
 WSL Women's Super League: 2013, 2014

 Bayern München
 Bundesliga: 2015–16

National team
 UEFA Women's Under-17 Championship:
 Winner: 2009
 UEFA Women's Under-19 Championship:
 Winner: 2011
 FIFA U-20 Women's World Cup:
 Runner-up: 2012

Individual 

 Liverpool Womens Player of the Season Award: 2014

See also

 Foreign players in the FA WSL

References

External links

1992 births
Living people
People from Ochsenhausen
Sportspeople from Tübingen (region)
German women's footballers
Women's Super League players
Expatriate women's footballers in England
SC 07 Bad Neuenahr players
Liverpool F.C. Women players
FC Bayern Munich (women) players
German expatriate sportspeople in England
Frauen-Bundesliga players
Women's association football midfielders
Footballers from Baden-Württemberg
Germany women's international footballers